Donyale Werle is a scenic designer from Nashville, Tennessee.

Biography
Werle obtained her BFA in painting from the University of New Mexico and her MFA in set design from the Tisch School of the Arts at New York University. She has designed for multiple Broadway shows, including Bloody Bloody Andrew Jackson for which she received a 2011 Tony nomination. Her design for Peter and the Starcatcher won her the 2012 Tony award.  She has also received 2011 Obie for Sustained Excellence of Set Design.

Werle's designs focus on sustainability. She uses found objects, thrift shop finds, and many other materials she purchases second hand. She is the co-chair of the pre/post production committee for the Broadway Green Alliance. Her set design for the 2009 production of Broke-ology at the Lincoln Center featured a set built and decorated from products purchased at Habitat for Humanity's ReStores.

In 2017 Werle began studying horticulture and pursuing a Certificate in Horticulture through the Brooklyn Botanic Garden. In response to the COVID-19 shutdown of theatrical productions nationwide in 2020, Werle and her husband launched Theater/Gardens*NYC, a garden design and installation company.

In June 2020 students and alumni from the Department of Design for Stage & Film issued a letter to NYU demanding greater diversity within the department. Noting that while 50% of the students in the department are students of color, or international, over 90% of the faculty are white. In response to the letter, Werle resigned from her position as Adjunct Professor at the Tisch School of the Arts at New York University in solidarity with Andromache Chalfant. The resignations were designed to make room for BIPOC faculty to take their place.

Personal life
Werle's studio and home is in Brooklyn, New York, where she lives with her husband Paul Jepson, a stagehand at the Brooklyn Academy of Music.

Awards and nominations for theater

References

External links
 

American scenic designers
Tony Award winners
Obie Award recipients
Year of birth missing (living people)
Living people
Women scenic designers
People from Nashville, Tennessee
University of New Mexico alumni
Tisch School of the Arts alumni